David Longoria is a GRAMMY Award nominated American trumpeter, songwriter, singer, and music producer.

Singles
Longoria's dance/pop song "Deeper Love", a duet with CeCe Peniston, peaked at No. 14 under Billboard magazine's "Hot Dance Club Play" category in 2005.

Longoria produced other records including an instrumental hit Timbuctu with DJ and producer Keith Marantz under the moniker "Sticks & Stones" which entered the US Billboard "Hot Dance Club Play" category in 1995. Others include "Look Who's Talking" by Dr. Alban which entered the US Billboard "Hot Dance Club Play" category in 2002, Sparks "When Do I Get To Sing My Way" which topped Billboard charts in the US and much of Europe. Longoria produced singer Michael J. Downey's International albums "Bridge of No Return" and "America" including the 2007 Top 10 single "America".

In September 2012 Longoria released an instrumental dance pop single titled "Zoon Baloomba" which was remixed by popular remixers including Ralphi Rosario, Majik Boys, DJ Yannis, European music producer and remixer DJ Mental Blue and others. Zoon Baloomba entered the US Billboard Dance Music Chart at No. 50 on October 6, 2012. When it debuted it became the first recording on this chart by a trumpeter since Herb Alpert charted his instrumental single "Rise" in 1979. "Zoon Baloomba" climbed the Billboard chart for the following eight weeks, reaching No. 21 on November 18, 2012.

In October 2018 Longoria released a dance song featuring Dallas Lovato called Playground which debuted on the US Billboard "Hot Dance Club Play" chart on October 13.

We Are One
On September 29, 2022, Longoria released a song he wrote and produced with frequent collaborator Robert Eibach called We Are One. The song was recorded in cities across the U.S. over a period of four years and includes performances by more than 750 recording artists from many genres, generations, and cultures. It was launched on the lawn of the White House for the Day Of Prayer For Our Nation event with the National Day Of Prayer 2022 where Longoria led a choir from across America in singing the song. 

Some of the artists singing on the song include April Diamond, Ava Gold, Barbara Morrison, Bonnie Pointer, Brenda Holloway, Carol Connors, Chris Montez, Christina Gaudet, Corey Feldman, Dallas Lovato, Darlene Love, Dawnn Lewis, Dazz Band, Fanita James, Florence LaRue, Fourever1, Frank Stallone, Freda Payne, JJ Totah, Jerry Bell, Jessica Parker Kennedy, Keaton Simons, Larissa Lam, Madison De La Garza, Malynda Hale, Marvin Gaye III, María Conchita Alonso, Lucas Longoria, Only Won, Peaches & Herb, Pointer Sisters, Promise Marks, The Babys, The Coasters, The Drifters, Trent Park, Voices of Unity. 
Vocals.

Studio albums
Baila!, Longoria's vocal and instrumental album, was officially released on September 30, 2013.

The title song, also called "All She Does Is Dance" was used for a music video produced as a tribute to the classic film Casablanca. Set in Morocco, it stars Longoria as Rick and Wanda Rovira as the female love interest. The music video received a nomination for "Best Independent Music Video" in the 2016 Hollywood Music In Media Awards (HMMA).

Longoria released a contemporary instrumental album on Del Oro Music titled The Journey which featured flautist Wouter Kellerman.

El Viaje, Longoria's international instrumental album, was officially released on May 15, 2017. In 2019 Longoria released the album MOOD,   a collection of iconic jazz standards featuring guest performances by Barbara Morrison , Freda Payne , Promise Marks, Marc Antonelli and Poncho Sanchez. The recording of Body And Soul featured Barbara Morrison and was awarded Best Jazz  by Hollywood Music In Media Awards. In 2020 Longoria released the album A Better Place which featured guest artists Barbara Morrison and Promise Marks. The jazz album included jazz musicians Rique Pantoja on piano, bassist Maciej Sadowski, drummers Kip Webster and Tony Jones, guitarist Doug Perkins and percussionist Dale Chung.

Guest performances
In October 2017 American rock band Smash Mouth released their 20th Anniversary of their hit "Walkin' on the Sun" with the Robert Eibach remix featuring Longoria's trumpet solo. The single peaked at No. 5 on the Billboard Club Play chart. Longoria was featured on General Public's studio album Rub It Better with a trumpet solo on Friends Again.

Movie work
Longoria composed and performed the theme song for the movie "Bloodline: Now Or Never" called "Now Or Never" featuring April Diamond. The music was co-written and produced by Robert Eibach. The song qualified for the 2018 Academy Awards under "Best Original Song" reaching the short list on the ballot.

In 2016 Longoria composed and performed the score for the short film "Becoming A Man", a coming of age story set in East Los Angeles. The score was widely acclaimed for its combination of Latin jazz and hip hop styles. This was awarded the Hollywood Music in Media Awards nomination and win under the category of "Best Score- Short Movie"

References

External links
 Official site 
 Official charity site 
 Official music site

Place of birth missing (living people)
Living people
American jazz composers
American male songwriters
American jazz trumpeters
American male trumpeters
Musicians from Seattle
People from Renton, Washington
Musicians from Colorado Springs, Colorado
Songwriters from Washington (state)
1977 births
21st-century trumpeters
Jazz musicians from Colorado
American male jazz composers
21st-century American male musicians
Jazz musicians from Washington (state)